Cornelius Wortham (born January 25, 1982) is a former American football linebacker.

Football career
He played for Seattle Seahawks of the NFL before getting cut prior the 2006 season. In February 2007, Cornelius was signed as a free agent by the New Orleans Saints. He is expected to be allocated to NFL Europa and then take part in the Saints 2007 Training Camp.
He attended the University of Alabama.

Personal life
Wortham currently resides in Indiana.

1982 births
Alabama Crimson Tide football players
American football linebackers
Living people
People from Calhoun City, Mississippi
Players of American football from Mississippi 
Seattle Seahawks players